25 is a compilation album by American rock band Blues Traveler celebrating their 25th anniversary. It was released on March 6, 2012. The album's first disc is a greatest hits retrospective and the second contains a mix of rarities, including b-sides, a demo, unreleased studio tracks, and a remix of "Run-around".

Track listing
All songs by John Popper except where noted.

Disc 1: Greatest Hits
 "Run-Around" – 4:40
 "Hook" – 4:50
 "The Mountains Win Again" (Sheehan) – 5:05
 "But Anyway" (Chan Kinchla, Popper) – 4:09
 "You, Me and Everything" – 4:21
 "Amber Awaits" (Kinchla/Popper/Wilson) – 3:47
 "After What" (Popper/Wilson) – 3:34
 "Back in the Day" (Blues Traveler) – 4:01
 "Girl Inside My Head" (Blues Traveler) – 3:36
 "Carolina Blues" (Kinchla, Popper) – 4:44
 "Let Her and Let Go" (Kinchla/Popper) – 3:39
 "Gina" (Kinchla, Popper) – 4:03
 "100 Years" – 3:43
 "What's for Breakfast" (Popper/Sheehan) – 3:45
 "NY Prophesie" (Kinchla/Popper) – 4:35
 "Unable to Get Free" (Kinchla/Popper/Wilson) – 4:23
 "How You Remember It" – 4:06
 "What I Got" (Sublime cover)

Disc 2: B-sides/Unreleased
 "The Demon"
 "The Poignant & Epic Saga of Featherhead & Lucky Lack"
 "Blue Hour"
 "Trust in Trust" (demo)
 "Didn't Mean to Wake Up"
 "But Anyway '88"
 "Random Amounts"
 "Twelve Swords" (from Decisions of the Sky) – 3:20
 "The Sun and the Storm" (from Decisions of the Sky) – 7:58
 "Traveler Suite" (from Decisions of the Sky) – 20:17 
 "Run-Around" (Gunslinger Remix)

Personnel
John Popper – Vocals, harmonica, 12-string guitar
Chan Kinchla – Guitar
Bobby Sheehan, Tad Kinchla – Bass
Brendan Hill – Drums, percussion
Ben Wilson – Keyboards
Joan Osborne – Backing vocals on "100 Years"
Warren Haynes – Slide guitar on "The Mountains Win Again"
Arnie Lawrence – Soprano saxophone on "100 Years"

Charts

References

2012 compilation albums
Blues Traveler albums
A&M Records compilation albums
B-side compilation albums